St. John the Evangelist Roman Catholic Church is located on the South Parade in the south-east section of Bath City Centre – the old Ham District where John Wood the Elder, the Georgian architect, had originally planned his gigantic "Forum".

Architecture

The decorative Gothic-styled spire dominates the city's skyline, which has irked some people such as noted architectural critic Nikolaus Pevsner who accuses the church of being "a demonstrative proof of how intensely the Gothicists hated the Georgians of Bath."  Christopher Martin takes a more measured view in his work on English Catholic churches, commenting "the stately interior is a good reflection of mid-Victorian taste", and remarking on the colourful polished marble, the exquisite screen, the blazing and triumphant white tabernacle, the delicate communion rails, a series of references to St John, and the chapels, each with something to admire.

The structure was designed and built between 1861-3 by Charles Francis Hansom, who was the brother of J. A. Hansom, the creator of the Hansom cab, and had formerly done the village church at Hanley Swan. The brothers also prepared designs for Woodchester Mansion in Nympsfield, Gloucestershire, after A. W. N. Pugin had resigned from the project. For this reason, they are often quoted as being the second best Roman Catholic architects of their day, for their success in picking up commissions Pugin had passed over. Woodchester Mansion's north service wing was also designed by them in the same Gothic style.

The walls are of Bath stone.  The church's  spire was added by Hansom in 1867. The baptistery, a shrine containing the relics of Saint Justina of Padua, was designed by Edward Joseph Hansom, his son, in 1871.

The brothers considered the church to be one of their best works. Pevsner's typical terse description describes the church as follows:

History

The church was put up by the Benedictines based at Downside Abbey, which accounts for the substantial ancillary buildings intended to accommodate a small community of priests.  It was handed over to the  Diocese of Clifton in 1932.

The building was bombed in 1942: four people died and the south aisle was destroyed, but subsequently rebuilt in a similar Gothic style.  The inscription commemorating this event is in Latin: "Hostili incursione diruta...".

The steeple provides a nest for a breeding pair of peregrine falcons. The nesting site is monitored by a publicly viewable webcam.

Parish
The parish lies within the Roman Catholic Diocese of Clifton, and is one of four within the City of Bath.  There are currently three priests, one a Pole who celebrates Mass in his own tongue each Sunday for the local Polish community.  The parish priest, Fr. Christopher Whitehead celebrated twenty years of priestly ministry in 2019, and began as Parish Priest in September 2019.

References

Further reading
Nikolaus Pevsner, The Buildings of England: North Somerset and Bristol, (Harmondsworth, Middlesex: Penguin Books, 1958), 106.

External links
 

Roman Catholic churches completed in 1863
Towers completed in 1867
Roman Catholic churches in Somerset
Saint John
Grade II* listed churches in Somerset
Grade II* listed Roman Catholic churches in England
British churches bombed by the Luftwaffe
Grade II* listed buildings in Bath, Somerset
19th-century Roman Catholic church buildings in the United Kingdom